Lewis MacAdams (October 12, 1944 – April 21, 2020) was an American poet, journalist, political activist, and filmmaker.

Early life and education
MacAdams was born in San Angelo, Texas and grew up in Dallas, where he graduated from St. Mark's School of Texas in 1962. He then graduated from Princeton University in 1966. He then earned a Master's degree from the University at Buffalo.

Career 
MacAdams was the author of a dozen books and tapes of poetry, and his poems have appeared in many anthologies. In 2001, he published his Birth of The Cool, a cultural history of the idea of cool. As a journalist, MacAdams was a contributing editor of L.A. Weekly and wrote regularly on culture and ecology for Rolling Stone, Men’s Journal, the Los Angeles Times, and Los Angeles magazine. MacAdams was the director of the Poetry Center at San Francisco State University from 1975 to 1978.

As a political activist, MacAdams was a cofounder of Friends of the Los Angeles River (FoLAR) established in 1985 (and served as chair on their board of directors). FoLAR was characterized by MacAdams as a "40 year art work" to bring the Los Angeles River back to life. In the years which followed, he became the river’s most important and influential advocate. Among FoLAR’s many projects are an annual river clean-up, the "Gran Limpieza," which brings 2500 people down to the river every spring to clean up; and an ongoing series of conferences and planning workshops dealing with every aspect of the river. Two of its current major goals are to create a Los Angeles River Conservancy to oversee restoration of the river, and a River Watch program to improve the River’s water quality and target polluters 
 
In 1991, MacAdams received the San Fernando Valley Audubon Society’s annual Conservation Award. MacAdams' work, The River: Books One, Two & Three, takes the Los Angeles River as its metaphor, weaving the story and song of the poet, activist and journalist as these three roles form the confluence which is the man.

Death 
On April 21, 2020, MacAdams died at the age of 75 from complications of Parkinson’s disease. He is survived by his three sons and his daughter.

Selected publications

Books
City Money: Poems. Burning Water (1966)  
City Room
The Poetry Room. New York: Harper & Row; First Edition (January 1, 1970) 
A Bolinas Report
Tilth
Dance, pamphlet. Canton: The Institute of Further Studies; first edition (January 1, 1972)
News From Niman Farm, Tombouctou Books, 1976; first edition (November 1976)
Live At The Church. Kulchur Foundation (1977)
Blind Date, pamphlet. Am Here Books/Immediate Editions; first edition (January 1, 1981)
The Angel (with Rita Degli Esposti & Gianantonio Pozzi)
Africa and The Marriage of Walt Whitman and Marilyn Monroe. Little Caesar Press (1982) 
The River, Books One & Two. Palo Alto, CA: Blue Press, 1998
Birth of the Cool: Beat, Bebop, and the American Avant-Garde. New York: The Free Press, 2001
The Family Trees, (illustrated by Kim Abeles). Palo Alto, CA: Blue Press, 2001
A Poem for the Dawn of the Terror Years. Palo Alto, CA: Blue Press, 2003
The River: Books One, Two, and Three. Palo Alto, CA: Blue Press, revised second edition, 2007 
Lyrics. Palo Alto, CA: Blue Press, 2009
Dear Oxygen. New Orleans, LA: University of New Orleans Press, 2011

Audiotapes and CD's
To The Russian Women
And Now The News
Dear Oxygen Audio CD Collaboration with The Dark Bob (2007)
"Good Grief" Audio CD Collaboration with The Dark Bob (2015)

Articles
 “Poetry and Politics.” Talking poetics from Naropa Institute : annals of the Jack Kerouac School of Disembodied Poetics V. 2. Ed. Anne Waldman and Marilyn Webb, Boulder, Colo. : Shambhala, 1979
 Remembering Jim Carroll. Los Angeles Times. 16 September 2009.

Films
Directed (with Richard Lerner), What Happened to Kerouac? (1986)

Directed (with Jo Bonney), Funhouse (1986)  Funhouse (1986) - IMDb

See also
List of poets from the United States

References

External links
Interview of Lewis MacAdams, part of Environmental Activism in Los Angeles interview series, Center for Oral History Research, UCLA Library Special Collections, University of California, Los Angeles.
Q: What do I love about Philip Whalen's poems? written for the L.A. Weekly on the occasion of the publication of Philip Whalen’s Overtime, March, 1999 
Interview with Lewis MacAdams subtitled: Birth of the Cool. Beat, Bebop and the American Avant-Garde. MacAdams is interviewed by Paul DeRienzo
Grand Central Station a chapbook of poems by MacAdams featured at Big Bridge#9
Friends of the Los Angeles River main website
Dale Smith reviews Lewis MacAdams
Orhan Pamuk's L.A. stroll conjures up familiar sights MacAdams article, which first appeared November 2009 in the L.A. Times, discusses the Nobel prize-winning author Orhan Pamuk, and his bond with Los Angeles' old-fashioned urban scape.
KCET Departures interview with Lewis Macadams artist and advocate of the L.A. River

American male poets
American literary critics
Writers from Los Angeles
Writers from Texas
People from San Angelo, Texas
Princeton University alumni
Los Angeles River
St. Mark's School (Texas) alumni
American male non-fiction writers
1944 births
2020 deaths
Deaths from Parkinson's disease
Neurological disease deaths in California
University at Buffalo alumni